MSC may refer to:

Computers
 Message Sequence Chart
 Microelectronics Support Centre of UK Rutherford Appleton Laboratory
 MIDI Show Control
 MSC Malaysia (formerly known as Multimedia Super Corridor)
 USB mass storage device class (USB MSC)
 Mobile Switching Center, of a phone network
 Management saved console

Corporations
 Managed service company, a UK company structure
 MSC Industrial Direct, formerly Manhattan Supply Company
 MSC Software, simulation software company, formerly MacNeal-Schwendler Corporation
 Metric Systems Corporation
 Mediterranean Shipping Company

Education
 Master of Science, usually MSc or M.Sc.
 Mastère en sciences,  French degree
 Memorial Student Center, Texas A&M University, US
 Mesa State College, Colorado, United States 
 Mount Saint Charles Academy, Catholic school in Rhode Island, United States 
 Munsang College, Hong Kong
 Marinduque State College, Philippines, now Marinduque State University

Military 
 Medical Service Corps, of the US military forces
 Military Sealift Command, US Navy
 Military Staff Committee, United Nations body
 Munich Security Conference, annual international security conference

Religious 
 Marianites of Holy Cross
 Missionaries of the Sacred Heart

Science 
 Miles of Standard Cable, former telephony unit of loss
 Manned Spacecraft Center, later Johnson Space Center
 Mathematics Subject Classification
 Messinian salinity crisis, a geological event
 Meteorological Service of Canada

Biology
 Mechanosensitive channels
 Mesenchymal stem cell
 MSC (gene), a human gene encoding the protein musculin

Seafaring 
 Maritime Safety Committee, a United Nations body
 Marine Stewardship Council, concerned with sustainable fishing 
 Manchester Ship Canal, England
 Mediterranean Shipping Company, a container shipping company 
 MSC Cruises, a cruise line

Sports 
 Metro Suburban Conference, athletic conference, Illinois, US
 Mid-South Conference, US athletic conference
 Mobile Legends: Bang Bang Southeast Asia Cup, MOBA esports tournament
 Mohammedan Sporting Club (Dhaka), Bangladesh
 Mohammedan Sporting Club (Chittagong), a branch in Chittagong
 Mohammedan Sporting Club (Kolkata)
 Mombasa Sports Club, Kenya

Other
 Air Cairo (ICAO designator), Egyptian airline
 Mail services center
 Manpower Services Commission, UK, 1973-1987
 Member of State Council
 Meritorious Service Cross, a Canadian decoration bestowed by the Monarch
 Metropolitan Special Constabulary, London, England
 Motorcycle Stability Control, an ABS variant
 Movimiento Scout Católico (Catholic Scout Movement), Spain